Cathy Crowe,  (born 1952) is a Canadian "street nurse", educator, author, social justice activist and filmmaker, specializing in advocacy for the homeless in Canada. She is a frequent commentator on issues related to health, homelessness and affordable housing. She is currently a visiting practitioner at Toronto Metropolitan University.

Early life and education

Born in Cobourg, Ontario, but raised in Kingston, Ontario, Cathy Crowe moved to Toronto to work and study at the Toronto General Hospital, where she received a diploma in nursing in 1972. In 1985, she received a Bachelor of Applied Arts in nursing from Ryerson Polytechnical Institute (now Toronto Metropolitan University). In 1992, she received her Master of Education in Sociology, from the Ontario Institute for Studies in Education (OISE).

She was married twice; with her last marriage, to former Metro Toronto Councillor Roger Hollander, ending in divorce in 1995. She has a daughter and three grandsons.

Community work

Crowe became known as a "street nurse", a term coined in the early 1990s by a homeless man in the impoverished downtown Toronto area where she worked. She is noted for her work with the homeless and poor populations in Toronto, Canada's largest city. She is an activist for affordable housing, public health and social justice. In 1998, along with other social justice activists and academics, she co-founded the Toronto Disaster Relief Committee (TDRC). They brought public attention to homelessness, declaring it to be a man-made disaster, which in their view, qualified as a social welfare disaster requiring the same kind of response that governments give to natural disasters. This human-disaster was the basis for the name of the group and many of its ideas. The TDRC and Crowe promoted the idea of a "One Percent Solution" to end homelessness. The one percent solution calls for each level of government to commit an additional one percent of their budget towards affordable, social housing.

Electoral politics
In January 2010, Crowe entered electoral politics by offering to run for the Ontario New Democratic Party (ONDP) as their candidate in the February 4 by-election in the riding of Toronto Centre. At the ONDP's January 10 nomination meeting, her candidacy went uncontested. She faced Ontario Liberal Party candidate Glen Murray and Pamela Taylor for the Ontario Progressive Conservative Party. Crowe finished a strong second, doubling the NDP's vote totals by taking 33 percent of the popular vote. She ran a second time in the 2011 provincial general election but lost to incumbent Murray.  For many years she worked closely with former Toronto City Councillor and leader of the federal NDP Jack Layton. She wrote the foreword to his book Homelessness. How to End the National Crisis which he co-authored with Michael Shapcott.

Publications 
Crowe's book, Dying for a Home: Homeless Activists Speak Out, is a first-hand account of Canadian homelessness and also discusses the practical steps needed to address the problem.

Crowe published her memoirs, A Knapsack Full of Dreams: Memoirs of a Street Nurse in 2019. In it, she reflects on her life as a street nurse and advocate for the homeless; the role characterized by some journalists of a "relentless accuser" advocating for policy change that addresses the causes of social injustice, rather than dealing simply with the symptoms.

Crowe co-edited Displacement City. Fighting for Health and Homes in a Pandemic.

Films 
Crowe has been involved in multiple documentary films about homelessness:

Home Safe Hamilton (2010), Development research with filmmaker Laura Sky, Skyworks Charitable Foundation.
Home Safe Toronto (2009).  Executive Producer. Filmmaker – Laura Sky, Skyworks Charitable Foundation.
Home Safe Calgary (2008).  Executive Producer. Filmmaker – Laura Sky, Skyworks Charitable Foundation.
Street Nurse (2002).  Subject participant. Filmmaker – Shelley Saywell, Bishari Film Productions.
Shelter From The Storm (2001).  Development research.  A profile of Toronto Disaster Relief Committee and Tent City Toronto.  Filmmaker – Michael Connolly.

Awards
Crowe received an International Nursing Ethics Award in 2003 in Amsterdam. She was also the recipient of the Economic Justice Fellowship Award, from the Atkinson Charitable Foundation, in 2004 which was twice renewed. She was named Person of the Year by the Toronto Sun (2000) and Toronto's Best Homelessness advocate by NOW magazine (2005). In January 2018, Crowe was appointed as a Member of the Order of Canada. She is a recipient of numerous honorary doctorates (University of Victoria, McMaster University, University of Ottawa, York University, University of Windsor, Law Union of Ontario) and an honorary Bachelor of Applied Sciences (Humber College).

Electoral record

References

Bibliography

External links
Official website
Toronto Disaster Relief Committee

1952 births
Living people
21st-century Canadian women writers
Activists from Toronto
Canadian anti-poverty activists
Canadian documentary film producers
Canadian educators
Canadian people of Irish descent
Health activists
Homelessness activists
Housing reformers
Members of the Order of Canada
Ontario New Democratic Party candidates in Ontario provincial elections
People from Cobourg
Politicians from Toronto
Toronto Metropolitan University alumni
Social justice activists
University of Toronto alumni
Canadian women film producers
Film producers from Ontario